John William Fritz (June 15, 1896 – April 19, 1984) was the captain of Homicide and Robbery Bureau of the Dallas Police Department. In November 1963, he received nationwide attention as the head of the police investigation of the murder of president John F. Kennedy and the primary interrogator of Lee Harvey Oswald.

Early life
Fritz was born on June 15, 1896, in Dublin, Texas. He spent much of his childhood on a ranch near Lake Arthur, New Mexico. As a young man, he earned a living as a horse and mule merchant, traveling around West Texas and New Mexico. He served briefly in the army during World War I. In the early 1920s, he enrolled in Tarleton State College (now Tarleton State University) in Stephenville, Texas.

Police career
Fritz joined the Dallas Police Department in 1921 and soon became a detective. In the early 1930s, he was involved in the hunt for Bonnie and Clyde. He was promoted to captain in 1934 to organize the Homicide and Robbery Bureau. Although he was made an inspector of detectives in 1935, he voluntarily returned to the rank of captain in 1944. In 1947, he was given the title of senior captain, as he reportedly refused the offer to become the Dallas police chief. As the captain of the Homicide and Robbery Bureau,  Fritz gained a reputation as a skilled interrogator. 

The Homicide and Robbery Bureau was considered the elite unit of the Dallas Police Department, and its detectives wore unique Stetson hats. Because of his experience and intimidating demeanor, most Dallas police officers respected and feared Fritz more than Dallas police chief Jesse Curry. According to author Vincent Bugliosi, Fritz was known to run his bureau as his "own private and independent fiefdom". Dallas district attorney Henry Wade told the Warren Commission that Fritz "runs a kind of one-man operation", and was reluctant to tell others what he was doing.

Kennedy assassination
On November 22, 1963, around 1 PM (about 30 minutes after the assassination), Fritz led the search of the Texas Schoolbook Depository building. A bolt action rifle and three empty rifle cartridges were discovered by his team on the building's sixth floor. 

After Oswald's apprehension as a suspect in the killing of officer J. D. Tippit, Fritz connected him to the Kennedy assassination, because Oswald was the only employee missing from the building.

Fritz questioned Oswald all afternoon about the shootings of Kennedy and Tippit. The Dallas police intermittently questioned him for approximately 12 hours between 2:30 p.m., on November 22, and 11 a.m., on November 24. Throughout, Oswald denied any involvement with either shooting. Fritz kept only rudimentary notes. Days later, he wrote a report of the interrogation from notes he made afterwards. There were no stenographic or tape recordings. Representatives of other law enforcement agencies were also present, including the FBI and the Secret Service, and occasionally participated in the questioning. Several of the FBI agents who were present wrote contemporaneous reports of the interrogation.

On the evening of November 22, Texas School Book Depository superintendent Roy Truly was overheard by reporter Kent Biffle, informing Fritz that he had seen Oswald in “a storage room on the first floor”. Fritz wrote that Truly saw Oswald “immediately after the shooting somewhere near the back stairway”. The storage room on the first floor was located near the back stairway. Fritz wrote in his notes that Oswald claimed he was “out with [William Shelley, a foreman at the depository] in front”.

Fritz did not get a confession from Oswald, but said he had all the proof he needed to convict. On November 22, before midnight, Fritz formally charged Oswald with murder.  

Operating under chief Curry, Fritz helped plan the transfer of Oswald from the police headquarters to the Dallas county jail. He was present when Oswald was shot by Jack Ruby on November 24. 

Fritz provided testimony to Warren Commission assistant counsel Joseph A. Ball. He provided additional testimony on July 14, 1964 to assistant counsel Leon D. Hubert Jr.

Later life and death
Fritz rarely gave interviews or spoke about the assassination in public. In 1969, he was transferred to the position of night commander of the criminal investigation division, a move that can be interpreted as a demotion. Fritz retired on February 27, 1970 after 49 years of service, and spent his retirement hunting, fishing and keeping cattle. He was divorced from his wife, and lived alone much of his life in the White Plaza Hotel, located near the Dallas police headquarters.  

Fritz died on April 19, 1984.

Portrayals in movies
Fifteen years after the assassination, Fritz was portrayed by Lou Frizzell in the 1978 made-for-television movie, Ruby and Oswald. 

In the 1991 Oliver Stone film JFK, Fritz was portrayed by William Larsen.

He was portrayed by Mike Shiflett in the 2013 TV movie Killing Kennedy.

References

External links

1896 births
1984 deaths
American police officers
People associated with the assassination of John F. Kennedy
Dallas Police Department officers
People from Dallas
People from Dublin, Texas